Espagnac is a commune in the Corrèze department in central France.

Geography
The landscape is typically wooded hills.

Economy
The main economic activity is cattle raising though it now benefits from the recent trend of rural tourism.

History
Though evidences of neolithic and Celtic occupation exist on the commune's territory, the village itself was probably only founded during or after the Gallo-Roman era, near the site of a villa not yet excavated. Some evidences suggest the presence of other villas and of a tile factory. The name of the village if of Latin origin, possibly derived from a family name.

During the Middle Ages, Espagnac seems to have become a dwelling of local importance, as attested by the existence of a Merovingian mint (three gold coins with the mention "Spaniaco Fit" have been found), of a large cemetery where sarcophagi have been exhumed and of an abbey. It seems to have been the head of a Carolingian vicaria. The first written mention of its name appears in the will of Adhemar des Echelles, around 930 AD.

Then dependent on the abbey of Tulle, Espagnac devolved during the late Middle Ages, and both the abbey and the church were burnt down by the troops of Gaspard de Coligny during the Wars of Religion. The current church dates back from the late 16th century. A small restored Carolingian Chapel and the privately owned medieval castle of Puy-de-Val are also present on the territory of the commune.

Population

See also
Communes of the Corrèze department

References

Communes of Corrèze
Corrèze communes articles needing translation from French Wikipedia